The Mitchell-Estes Farmstead, in Edmonson and Warren counties near Smiths Grove, Kentucky is a historic site which was listed on the National Register of Historic Places in 1996.

The main house is a vernacular building, built of limestone and yellow poplar wood, with ornamentation that is Queen Anne free classic in style.  The house was originally  in plan and has a  rear addition.  It has also been known as the Old Jack White Homestead.

References

National Register of Historic Places in Edmonson County, Kentucky
National Register of Historic Places in Warren County, Kentucky
Queen Anne architecture in Kentucky
Houses completed in 1892
1892 establishments in Kentucky
Farms on the National Register of Historic Places in Kentucky
Houses in Warren County, Kentucky
Houses on the National Register of Historic Places in Kentucky